In Greek mythology, Eurypylus (Eurypylos) was the name of several different people:

 Eurypylus, was a Thessalian king, son of Euaemon and Ops. He was a former suitor of Helen thus he led the Thessalians during Trojan War.
 Eurypylus, was son of Telephus and Astyoche. He was a great warrior, who led a Mysian contingent that fought alongside the Trojans against the Greeks in the Trojan War, and was killed by Achilles' son Neoptolemus.
 Eurypylus, son of Poseidon and king of Cos.
 Eurypylus, another son of Poseidon by the Pleiad Celaeno. He ruled over the Fortunate Islands.
 Eurypylus, the Thespian son of Heracles and Eubote, daughter of King Thespius of Thespiae. Eurypylus and his 49 half-brothers were born of Thespius' daughters who were impregnated by Heracles in one night, for a week or in the course of 50 days while hunting for the Cithaeronian lion. Later on, the hero sent a message to Thespius to keep seven of these sons and send three of them in Thebes while the remaining forty, joined by Iolaus, were dispatched to the island of Sardinia to found a colony.
 Eurypylus, a Pleuronian prince as the son of King Thestius and Eurythemis, daughter of Cleoboea. He was the brother of Althaea, Leda, Hypermnestra, Evippus, Plexippus and Iphiclus. Eurypylus participated in the hunt for the Calydonian Boar, during which he insulted Atalanta and was killed by Meleager.
 Eurypylus, son of Telestor and father of Asterodia who became the wife of Icarius of Sparta.
 Eurypylus, an Olenian prince as the son of King Dexamenus. He was the brother of Theronice, Theraephone and Deianira, also known as Mnesimache or Hippolyte. Eurypylus accompanied Heracles in his Trojan campaign. According to Pausanias, some authors related of him, and not of the son of Euaemon, the story of the cursed chest.
 Eurypylus, a prince of Tiryns as son of King Eurystheus and possibly Antimache, daughter of Amphidamas of Arcadia. He and his brothers Eurybius and Perimedes were all slain by Heracles when at a sacrificial meal in honor of his Twelve Labors being completed they served him a smaller portion of meat than they did for themselves. Eurypylus' other possible siblings were Admete, Alexander, Iphimedon and Mentor.
 Eurypylus, one of the Suitors of Penelope who came from Dulichium along with other 56 wooers. He, with the other suitors, was slain by Odysseus with the aid of Eumaeus, Philoetius, and Telemachus.
 Eurypylus, a son of Temenus, brother of Agelaus, Callias and Hyrnetho. As Temenus intended to leave his kingdom to Hyrnetho and Deiphontes, Eurypylus and his brothers hired assassins to kill Temenus, but the army still supported their sister and her husband.
 Eurypylus, father of two daughters Morphe and Clyte, who were said to have been the first prostitutes in history.

Notes

References 

 Apollodorus, The Library with an English Translation by Sir James George Frazer, F.B.A., F.R.S. in 2 Volumes, Cambridge, MA, Harvard University Press; London, William Heinemann Ltd. 1921. ISBN 0-674-99135-4. Online version at the Perseus Digital Library. Greek text available from the same website.
 Athenaeus of Naucratis, The Deipnosophists or Banquet of the Learned. London. Henry G. Bohn, York Street, Covent Garden. 1854. Online version at the Perseus Digital Library.
 Athenaeus of Naucratis, Deipnosophistae. Kaibel. In Aedibus B.G. Teubneri. Lipsiae. 1887. Greek text available at the Perseus Digital Library.
 Dictys Cretensis, from The Trojan War. The Chronicles of Dictys of Crete and Dares the Phrygian translated by Richard McIlwaine Frazer, Jr. (1931-). Indiana University Press. 1966. Online version at the Topos Text Project.
 Diodorus Siculus, The Library of History translated by Charles Henry Oldfather. Twelve volumes. Loeb Classical Library. Cambridge, Massachusetts: Harvard University Press; London: William Heinemann, Ltd. 1989. Vol. 3. Books 4.59–8. Online version at Bill Thayer's Web Site
 Diodorus Siculus, Bibliotheca Historica. Vol 1-2. Immanel Bekker. Ludwig Dindorf. Friedrich Vogel. in aedibus B. G. Teubneri. Leipzig. 1888–1890. Greek text available at the Perseus Digital Library.
 Gaius Julius Hyginus, Fabulae from The Myths of Hyginus translated and edited by Mary Grant. University of Kansas Publications in Humanistic Studies. Online version at the Topos Text Project.
Homer, The Iliad with an English Translation by A.T. Murray, Ph.D. in two volumes. Cambridge, MA., Harvard University Press; London, William Heinemann, Ltd. 1924. . Online version at the Perseus Digital Library.
 Homer, Homeri Opera in five volumes. Oxford, Oxford University Press. 1920. . Greek text available at the Perseus Digital Library.
 Pausanias, Description of Greece with an English Translation by W.H.S. Jones, Litt.D., and H.A. Ormerod, M.A., in 4 Volumes. Cambridge, MA, Harvard University Press; London, William Heinemann Ltd. 1918. . Online version at the Perseus Digital Library
 Pausanias, Graeciae Descriptio. 3 vols. Leipzig, Teubner. 1903.  Greek text available at the Perseus Digital Library.
 Theocritus, Idylls from The Greek Bucolic Poets translated by Edmonds, J M. Loeb Classical Library Volume 28. Cambridge, MA. Harvard University Press. 1912. Online version at theoi.com
 Theocritus, Idylls edited by R. J. Cholmeley, M.A. London. George Bell & Sons. 1901. Greek text available at the Perseus Digital Library.
Tzetzes, John, Book of Histories, Book II-IV translated by Gary Berkowitz from the original Greek of T. Kiessling's edition of 1826. Online version at theio.com

Princes in Greek mythology
Children of Heracles
Heracleidae
Suitors of Penelope
Aetolian characters in Greek mythology
be:Еўрыпіл, цар Коса
fr:Eurypylos